The 1933–34 season was the 37th in the history of the Western Football League.

The Division One champions for the first time in their history were Bath City. The winners of Division Two were Weymouth. There was again no promotion or relegation between the two divisions this season. The original Taunton Town club (not the current incarnation) became the first club in the history of the Western League to complete a season and lose all their games. The club disbanded after the end of the season.

Division One
After Bristol City Reserves and Cardiff City Reserves left the league, Division One was reduced from nine to seven clubs, with no new clubs joining.

Division Two
Division Two remained at eighteen clubs with no clubs leaving or joining.

References

1933-34
4